Dominic Thiem defeated Roger Federer in the final, 3–6, 6–3, 7–5 to win the men's singles tennis title at the 2019 Indian Wells Masters. It was his maiden ATP Tour Masters 1000 title, and he became the first Austrian to win a Masters title since Thomas Muster won the 1997 Miami Open.

Juan Martín del Potro was the reigning champion, but withdrew due to a knee injury before the tournament.

Seeds
All seeds received a bye into the second round.

Draw

Finals

Top half

Section 1

Section 2

Section 3

Section 4

Bottom half

Section 5

Section 6

Section 7

Section 8

Qualifying

Seeds

Qualifiers

Lucky losers

Qualifying draw

First qualifier

Second qualifier

Third qualifier

Fourth qualifier

Fifth qualifier

Sixth qualifier

Seventh qualifier

Eighth qualifier

Ninth qualifier

Tenth qualifier

Eleventh qualifier

Twelfth qualifier

References

External links
Main draw
Qualifying draw

]
Men's Singles